Peter Semple (born 29 April 1941) is a New Zealand former cricketer. He played 33 first-class matches for Otago between 1961 and 1972.

See also
 List of Otago representative cricketers

References

External links
 

1941 births
Living people
New Zealand cricketers
Otago cricketers
Cricketers from Dunedin